Love Halal, also called (Halal Love (and Sex)), is an international film from 2015, written and directed by Assad Fouladkar. The film premiered on December 13, 2015, at the Dubai International Film Festival and had its international premiere at the Sundance Film Festival in 2016 in the World Cinema Dramatic Competition.

Story 
The film tells four stories that are intertwined, tragic and sometimes comical. Some Muslims, both men and women, trying to satisfy their desires and love life without breaking their religious rules. The newlyweds Batoul and Mokhtar bicker constantly and threatens a divorce by the possessive jealousy Mokhtar. The neighbours depleted Awatah trying to find a second wife in order to meet the constant demands of her husband Salim. Their precocious daughters come with their own wild theory about the birds and the bees. Loubna meanwhile, is hoping a divorcee and emerging fashion designer, a second chance with her first love, the grocer Abu Ahmad, through a scandalous secret regarding marriage.

Cast

 Darine Hamze as Loubna
 Rodrigue Sleiman as Abou Ahmad
 Zeinab Khadra as Batoul
 Hussein Mokadem as Mokhtar
 Mirna Moukarzel as Awatef
 Ali Sammoury as Salim

External links 
 Halal Love (2015) - IMDB
 Halal Love (and Sex) at IFFR

References

Dutch comedy films
2015 comedy films
2015 films